Alberta Provincial Highway No. 31, commonly referred to as Highway 31, is a short north–south highway in central Alberta, Canada.

At the Highway 16 interchange, the route is signed as Highway 759 even though it is officially the northern terminus of Highway 31.

Major intersections

References 

031
759